Cribrihammus granulosus is a species of beetle in the family Cerambycidae. It was described by Dillon and Dillon in 1959. It is known from Kenya.

References

Lamiini
Beetles described in 1959